Krypianka is a river of Poland. Near Wólka Tyrzyńska it flows into the Gniewoszowsko-Kozienicki Canal, which discharges into the Zagożdżonka.

See also
Krępiec (river)

References

Rivers of Poland
Rivers of Masovian Voivodeship